Spaniards in France are people from Spain residing in France and their descendants. They may be French citizens or non-citizen immigrants or expatriates.

Spanish immigration to France began from ancient times up to the present time and the French Republic is the second largest Spanish community outside Spain. The Spanish arrived mainly attracted by the job and new lifestyles, as well due to conflicts and armed movements in Spain which prompted the Spanish to emigrate to France. Of these, according to the census of 2021 in Spain, 279,988 reside in the French Republic.

Demographics 
The 2012 Census recorded 198,182 Spanish-born people.

See also
France–Spain relations   
Spanish diaspora

References

 

European diaspora in France
 
Immigration to France by country of origin
France
Spanish diaspora in Europe